Lauri Leis (born 7 October 1978 in Võru) is an Estonian triple jumper.

He finished seventh at the 2001 Summer Universiade. He also competed at the 2002 European Championships, the 2004 Olympic Games and the 2006 European Championships without reaching the final.

His personal best jump is 16.67 metres, achieved in July 2008 in Kose.

His coach is Andrei Nazarov.

Achievements

References

1978 births
Living people
Estonian male triple jumpers
Athletes (track and field) at the 2004 Summer Olympics
Olympic athletes of Estonia
Sportspeople from Võru
World Athletics Championships athletes for Estonia
Competitors at the 2001 Summer Universiade